Jakab Kőszegi (22 August 1888 – 31 August 1982) was a Hungarian sports shooter. He competed in the 25 m pistol event at the 1936 Summer Olympics.

References

External links
 

1888 births
1982 deaths
Hungarian male sport shooters
Olympic shooters of Hungary
Shooters at the 1936 Summer Olympics
Sportspeople from Pest County